The Down Under Classic (currently known as the Schwalbe Classic, and previously known as the People's Choice Classic and Cancer Council Helpline Classic for sponsorship reasons), is a criterium around Rymill Park in Adelaide, South Australia, Australia. It precedes the Tour Down Under.

History
Since the very first Tour Down Under in 1999, there has been a history of city-based circuit racing in Adelaide. For several years the Tour Down Under featured a race around the East End of Adelaide and through the centre of Adelaide around King William Street.

The Down Under Classic was developed to retain a cycling race in the city from 2006 due to rules preventing the number of small circuit races in a multi-day stage race.

Caleb Ewan is the most successful cyclist in the race with four wins, including four of the last five editions.

Location
The Down Under Classic has traditionally raced around Rymill Park/Murlawirrapurka in the East End, however it has been relocated over the years.

In 2014, the race was moved to a circuit around Victoria Drive and the River Torrens, north of the University of Adelaide.

In 2017, it moved slightly south from Rymill Park to King Rodney Park/Ityamai-itpina before returning to its traditional configuration in 2019.

In 2020, it moved into the centre of Adelaide racing through main boulevards including Wakefield Street, Flinders Street and Victoria Square.

Format
The Down Under Classic is typically 'raced to distance'. For instance, in 2017 the race was 50.6 kilometres, or 22 laps of the King Rodney Park circuit.

In 2019, the format was changed to be time-certain, meaning the race lasted for exactly one hour and one lap. This reverted to the full-distance format in 2020.

Prizes
The Down Under Classic does not count towards time or points of the Tour Down Under and, while promoted as part of the Tour Down Under 'festival' alongside the men's and women's races, is a distinctly separate race.

Instead, riders compete for prize money, with four sprint primes and the finish line prize all offering up the opportunity to obtain financial reward.

The winner of the Down Under Classic is awarded a victor's jersey, which often presents in the colours of the event sponsor. Under Cancer Council sponsorship the jersey was blue and yellow, People's Choice was green and white (until 2018) and in 2019 the jersey was red, owing to SouthAustralia.com support.

Results

References

Cycling Archives

External links

Cycle races in Australia
Sports competitions in Adelaide
Recurring sporting events established in 2006
Men's road bicycle races
2006 establishments in Australia
Tour Down Under